Fredrik Halvorsen is a [Norwegian businessperson. He is a director at Ubon Partners.

He holds an undergraduate degree from the Norwegian School of Economics, and a graduate degree from the Kellogg School of Management.

Professional career

Halvorsen has held a number of positions during his career, including CEO of Seadrill, CEO of Tandberg and senior positions in Cisco and McKinsey & Company. He was chairman of Acano until its acquisition by Cisco in 2016.

He has been dubbed as John Fredriksen's wonderboy in Norwegian media.

References

Norwegian School of Economics alumni
1973 births
Living people
Norwegian businesspeople